KSS may refer to:

Education
 Kelowna Secondary School, in British Columbia, Canada
 Kibuli Secondary School, in Uganda
 Kingsmill Secondary School, a former high school in Etobicoke, Ontario
 Klahowya Secondary School, in Silverdale, Washington
 Knightswood Secondary School, in Glasgow, Scotland
 Kranji Secondary School, in Choa Chu Kang, Singapore
 Kwalikum Secondary School, in British Columbia, Canada

Entertainment
 Kalyana Samayal Saadham, a 2013 Indian film
 Kirby: Squeak Squad, a 2006 Nintendo DS game
 Kirby Super Star, a 1996 SNES game
 Kirby's Star Stacker, a 1997 Game Boy game

Other
 Basketball Federation of Serbia (Serbian: / )
 Communist Party of Slovakia (since 1992)
 Communist Party of Slovakia (1939) (1939–1990)
 Kata'ib Sayyid al-Shuhada, an Iraqi Shia militia
 Kearns–Sayre syndrome, a disease caused by mitochondrial DNA deletion
 Keystone State Skinheads, a white nationalist group in Pennsylvania
 Khitan small script, an undeciphered Chinese script
 Khwarizmi Science Society, a scientific society in Pakistan
 Kinetic Style Sheets, an AJAX framework for Plone (software)
 Kirtland Safety Society, a defunct Mormon bank in Kirtland, Ohio
 Kissi language (ISO 639 code: kss)
 Kristiania Sporveisselskab, a defunct tram company in Oslo, Norway
 , a Japanese anime studio
 KSS Design Group, an architecture design group
 Kudumbi Seva Sanghom, an Indian organisation; see Kudumbi
 The postnominal letters for a papal Knight of the Order of St. Sylvester
 Sikasso Airport (IATA airport code: KSS) in Mali
 Velocette KSS, a British motorcycle
 Kurdish Sorani Standard Bible
 Kochi Sun Sun Broadcasting, a Japanese commercial broadcaster